Clayton Wood is the training ground and academy of EFL Championship club Stoke City.

Development
In January 2009, Stoke City unveiled plans to redevelop their training ground at an initial cost of £5 million. Stoke City were given planning permission by the Stoke-on-Trent City Council to construct the facility in May 2009; Stoke had previously been renting the site from the Michelin Tyre company. The facility was designed by AFL architects who had previously designed Chelsea's Cobham Training Centre and Everton's Finch Farm. The centre was built in time for the start of the 2010–11 season.

In April 2012, Stoke announced £6 million expansions plans in order to meet the category one criteria in the Elite Player Performance Plan. In November 2015, further plans were announced to expand the facility.

References

Stoke City F.C.
Sport in Stoke-on-Trent
Clayton Wood